Pambak is a village in the Lori Region of Armenia.

Pambak is a village in Lori with under 100 households. There is a primary school located outside the residential area and across the main road connecting Vanadzor to Alaverdi.

References

Populated places in Lori Province